Etsuko Kamakura (born 1914, date of death unknown) was a Japanese diver. She competed in two events at the 1932 Summer Olympics.

References

External links
 

1914 births
Year of death missing
Japanese female divers
Olympic divers of Japan
Divers at the 1932 Summer Olympics
Place of birth missing
20th-century Japanese women